Nauman Wazir Khattak is a Pakistani politician who is currently a member of Senate of Pakistan, representing Pakistan Tehreek-e-Insaf. Was elected as the first Parliamentary Leader of Pakistan Teherek Insaf in the Senate of Pakistan.

Education
He has done B.E. (Aerospace) from Pakistan Air Force, College of Aerounatical Engineering,  affiliated with NED University of Engineering and Technology.

Political career
He was elected to the Senate of Pakistan as a candidate of Pakistan Tehreek-e-Insaf in 2015 Pakistani Senate election.

References

Living people
Pakistani senators (14th Parliament)
NED University of Engineering & Technology alumni
Pakistan Tehreek-e-Insaf politicians
Year of birth missing (living people)